Kisato Nakamura (中村妃智, born ) is a Japanese female track cyclist. She won the silver medal in the team pursuit at the 2016 Asian Cycling Championships.

She has qualified to represent Japan at the 2020 Summer Olympics.

Major results
2014
1st Points Race, Asian Track Championships
3rd Points Race, Japan Track Cup 1
2015
3rd Points Race, Japan Track Cup
3rd  Team Pursuit, Asian Track Championships (with Kanako Kase, Sakura Tsukagoshi and Minami Uwano)
2016
2nd  Team Pursuit, Asian Track Championships (with Yumi Kajihara, Sakura Tsukagoshi and Minami Uwano)
2017
3rd Points Race, National Track Championships

References

External links
 
 
 
 
 
 
 

1993 births
Living people
Japanese track cyclists
Japanese female cyclists
Place of birth missing (living people)
Cyclists at the 2014 Asian Games
Cyclists at the 2018 Asian Games
Medalists at the 2018 Asian Games
Asian Games bronze medalists for Japan
Asian Games medalists in cycling
Cyclists at the 2020 Summer Olympics
Olympic cyclists of Japan
20th-century Japanese women
21st-century Japanese women